Whipps may refer to:

Surangel S. Whipps, Palauan businessman and politician
Valerie Whipps, Palauan First Lady
Whipps Cross, area of the London Borough of Waltham Forest in London, England
Whipps Cross University Hospital, NHS-run University Hospital in Whipps Cross, Waltham Forest, London, England
Whipps Millgate, Kentucky, former city in Jefferson County, Kentucky, United States

See also
Whipp